Dorcadion talyshense is a species of beetle in the family Cerambycidae. It was described by Ludwig Ganglbauer in 1883. It is known from Iran.

References

talyshense
Beetles described in 1883